Spilarctia griseabrunnea is a moth in the family Erebidae. It was described by Jeremy Daniel Holloway in 1976. It is found on Borneo. The habitat consists of disturbed areas, agricultural areas and secondary vegetation ranging from the lowlands to altitudes of 1,200 meters.

References 

 

Moths described in 1976
griseabrunnea